Vocalization or vocalisation may refer to:

Speech, communication using the human voice
Vocable, an utterance that is not considered a word
Speech production, the processes by which spoken sounds are made
Animal communication, the transfer of information from one or a group of animals to another
Bird vocalization, bird calls and bird songs
Dolphin vocalizations
Female copulatory vocalizations, produced by females while mating
Voice (phonetics), the vibration of the vocal cords that accompanies some speech sounds
Consonant voicing and devoicing, the addition or removal of this vibration from consonant sounds
Vocalization, the change of a sound into a vowel
L-vocalization, the change of the consonant [l] into a vowel or semivowel
Vocal music, music performed by singers with or without instrumental accompaniment
Speech disfluency, an utterance that interrupts the normal flow of speech

Writing
Vocalization of consonantal text, the adding of vowels to a text written in consonants only
Arabic diacritics, symbols added to Arabic letters to represent vowels and consonant length
Niqqud, a system of diacritics to indicate vowel quality in Hebrew
Babylonian vocalization, a system of niqqud devised by the Masoretes of Babylon; defunct
Palestinian vocalization, a system of niqqud devised by the Masoretes of Jerusalem; defunct
Tiberian vocalization, a system of niqqud devised by the Masoretes of Tiberias; still in use

See also
Vocalise (disambiguation)